Tualatin High School is a public high school located in Tualatin, Oregon, United States. Students in grades 9 through 12 attend the school, which is part of the Tigard-Tualatin School District. Opened in 1992, school teams are known as the Timberwolves.

History

Tualatin High School's roots reach back to 1865 when a small red schoolhouse was built in the village. The schoolhouse went on to become Tualatin Elementary School and is now the location of the Tualatin Food Bank. It was replaced in 1900 with a new, two-room school on Boones Ferry Road, which is still a major thoroughfare in the city. A four-year high school program was offered for the first time in 1909 after the school was hoisted up and two more rooms were added beneath. However, the seven-member class of 1936 was the last class to graduate from the old Tualatin School. After that, students were sent to nearby high schools in Sherwood and Tigard. The move was further solidified in 1969 when Tualatin residents voted to officially join Tigard School District 23J.

In 1990, following rapid growth in Tualatin, the name of the district changed to the Tigard-Tualatin School District, a signal of Tualatin's emerging importance in the area's academic structure. Two years later, in 1992, the new Tualatin High School opened on a  campus. Students from area junior high schools voted on the school colors and mascot.

For several years, the school lacked a swimming pool and auditorium, as well as proper spectator stands for its state-of-the-art football field. As a result, many extracurricular activities, such as plays and sporting events, took place on the grounds of the school's rival, Tigard High School. This was corrected in summer 1998, when the school completed its new sports stadium. Later that year, it opened its own auditorium and swim center. Since then, the softball and baseball facilities and a multi-purpose field have been converted to turf.

The new T.E.C.H. Wing (Tualatin Engineering, Computers, and Health) opened in spring 2006. In the 2018–2019 school year, construction was in place all around the school to add a new main office, an addition to the T.E.C.H. Wing, extensions to the commons, new classrooms, and a new locker room for the boys and girls.

During the summer of 2003, school sequences of the 2005 independent film Thumbsucker (film) were filmed at the school.

Academics

In 2008, 85% of the school's seniors received a high school diploma. Of 370 students, 314 graduated, 35 dropped out, five received a modified diploma, and 16 were still in high school the following year.

Athletics

Individual state champions
 1996: Janna McDougall (50-yard freestyle + 100-yard freestyle) - girls' swimming
 1996: Sarah McCauley (200-yard freestyle) - girls' swimming
 1997: Janna McDougall (50-yard freestyle + 100-yard freestyle) - girls' swimming
 1997: Sarah McCauley (100-yard backstroke) - girls' swimming
 1998: Janna McDougall (50-yard freestyle + 100-yard freestyle) - girls' swimming
 1998: Sarah McCauley (200-yard freestyle + 100-yard backstroke) - girls' swimming
 1998: Bobby Barnett - boys' golf
 1999: Sarah McCauley (200-yard freestyle + 500-yard freestyle) - girls' swimming
 1999: Austin Smith - boys' golf
 2000: Matt Sorlien (500-yard freestyle) - boys' swimming
 2001: Julie McCauley (200-yard freestyle) - girls' swimming
 2002: Meghan Armstrong (1500 meter champion + 3000 meter champion) - girls' track and field
 2003: Meghan Armstrong (1500 meter champion + 3000 meter champion) - girls' track and field
 2004: Meghan Armstrong (1500 meter champion + 3000 meter champion) - girls' track and field
 2002: Dustin Andres - boys' golf
 2003: Andrew Leneve - boys' golf
 2004: Rebecca Alexander (100-yard freestyle) - girls' swimming
 2005: Kevin Dickson (long jump) - boys' track and field
 2009: Kelly Millager (high jump) - girls' track and field
 2013: Laura Taylor (pole vault) - girls' track and field
 2014: Laura Taylor (pole vault) - girls' track and field
 2016: Karina Moreland (triple jump) - girls' track and field
 2017: Ryan Cavinta (300 meter hurdles champion) - boys' track and field
 2018: Gerald Saina (shot put) - boys' track and field
 2018: Nano Kis (discus) - boys' track and field

State championships
 Boys' basketball: 2022, 2023
 Boys' golf: 2002, 2003, 2004
 Girls' soccer: 2005, 2006, 2011, 2013, 2014
 Cheerleading: 1994, 1998, 1999, 2003, 2006, 2011, 2012
 Girls' water polo: 2010, 2011, 2013, 2014
 Girls' golf: 2012
 Girls' softball: 2015, 2018
 Boys' track and field: 2019

Speech & Debate
 1997: Todd Borden and Alan Tauber won the state Cross-Examination Debate championship.
 1998: Owen Zahorcak and Brian Ward won the state Cross-Examination Debate championship.
 2001: Kara Borden and Jill Mehall placed 5th in the nation in Cross-Examination Debate.
 2005: Brent Hamilton and Alex Goodell won the state Cross-Examination Debate championship.
 2010: Tualatin placed third in the state Cross-Examination Debate championship.
 2011: Tualatin placed third in the state Cross-Examination Debate championship.

National champions
 Cheerleading: 1999

Theatre
 2013: Rashomon was chosen for presentation at the State Thespian Conference.

Notable alumni
 Danah Al-Nasrallah, track and field athlete
 Ian Fuller, soccer player
 Bret Harrison, actor
 Taylor Hart, college football, University of Oregon
 Luke Staley, college football, Brigham Young University
 Jarad vanSchaik, soccer player
 Courtney Verloo, soccer player
 Luke Osborn, college basketball, University of Oregon
 Lucas Noland, college football, University of Oregon
 Alexis Angeles, college basketball, Portland State University
 Nano Kis, track and field athlete, Colorado State University
 John Miller, college football, Oregon State University

Demographics
The demographic breakdown of the 1,944 students enrolled in 2019-20 was:
 Male - 51.9%
 Female - 48.1%
 Native American/Alaskan Native - 0.5%
 Asian - 6.2%
 Black - 1.3%
 Hispanic - 25.4%
 Native Hawaiian/Pacific Islander - 2.2%
 White - 56.8%
 Multiracial - 7.5%

21.9% of the students were eligible for free or reduced-cost lunch.

References

Educational institutions established in 1992
International Baccalaureate schools in Oregon
Tualatin, Oregon
High schools in Washington County, Oregon
Public high schools in Oregon
1992 establishments in Oregon